Lipovitsa is a rural locality (a village) in Chuchkovskoye Rural Settlement, Sokolsky District, Vologda Oblast, Russia. The population was 13 as of 2002.

Geography 
Lipovitsa is located 95 km northeast of Sokol (the district's administrative centre) by road. Vysokaya is the nearest rural locality.

References 

Rural localities in Sokolsky District, Vologda Oblast